Adnan Kisa is a Turkish health policy and economic expert.

Education
Kisa received a B.Sc. from Hacettepe University, master's degrees from Meharry Medical College and Istanbul University, and a doctorate in health policy and economics from Tulane University.

Career
Kisa has worked as faculty and administrator at the University of Oslo and Baskent University, adjunct faculty at Tulane University, Gazi, Ahmet Yesevi, and Zirve Universities. Kisa was selected for and provided a full scholarship for his master's and doctoral education between 1992 and 1998 in order to understand and bring the experiences of the US health system and the US policy back to Turkey.

Kisa has administered many scientific projects and worked as a consultant; as Health Economics and Policy Manager of Wyeth Pharmaceuticals,  he conducted the economic evaluation of a pneumococcal 7-valent conjugate vaccine for the national immunization list for Turkey. He was principal investigator of WHO WHS-Turkey, principal investigator of the National Burden of Disease and Cost-Effectiveness of Essential Health Services in Turkey, a consultant in WHO-ICC, PM of the Strengthening Management in Reproductive Health Services Project, a member of The Network of Innovators of the Chronic Conditions of the WHO, and a PE team member of the INFINITY Project at Tulane and the Perinatal Outcome Study MMC.

Publications
Kisa has more than 90 peer-reviewed published articles, books, book chapters, and research reports in English, Russian, Spanish, French, and Turkish. He is a member of many national and international health institutions, scientific boards, and editorial boards. He is the author, scientific writer, or editor of:
 Social Determinants of Healthcare Utilization in Dubai (LAP Lambert Academic Publishing, 2016)
 "Innovative Care for Chronic Conditions: Building Blocks for Action" (World Health Organization, 2002, Geneva)
 "Adherence to Long-term Therapies: Evidence for Action Report" (World Health Organization, 2003, Geneva)
 "Health Care Management" (Anadolu University Publications, 2007)
 World Health Systems – Global Engagement in Creating Financially Viable Healthcare Systems Proceedings book (2002)
 Proceedings: Sixth International Conference on Healthcare Systems (2010) 
 Introduction to Health Economics (1999)

References

Date of birth missing (living people)
Living people
Hacettepe University alumni
Meharry Medical College alumni
Istanbul University alumni
Tulane University alumni
Year of birth missing (living people)